Osvaldo Ríos Alonso (born October 25, 1960 in Carolina, Puerto Rico) is a Puerto Rican actor, model, singer, and guitarist, who is best known for his roles in telenovelas.  He has appeared in several soap operas, including Abrazame muy Fuerte,  Kassandra and the 1996 version of La Viuda de Blanco.

Biography

Born in Carolina, Puerto Rico, Osvaldo Ríos is a singer and actor. His television series have been seen across the world, including countries such as Spain, Bulgaria, Yugoslavia, Israel, the Arab world, Turkey, Greece, Indonesia, Japan, Russia, Armenia, China, India, Malaysia, Latin America and the United States. He is the main actor of the television series in the world's best-selling Latin American history, Kassandra, and the only Latin American actor whose television series have surpassed sales of 100 countries worldwide and translated into 32 languages. For this feat, he has appeared in the Guinness Book of World Records since 2001.

As an actor, he has participated in more than 20 television series and dramas. His main role in soap opera Kassandra, made for RCTV of Venezuela as well as Tres Destinos made in Los Angeles, Miami, Mexico and Puerto Rico for Telemundo Network USA, La Viuda de Blanco for RTI Colombia and Rauzán for RTI in co-production with Caracol TV, has earned favorable recognition international critics giving 17 awards for excellence best actor in over 7 countries in Latin America, USA and Europe. In fact, both Kassandra, and Tres Destinos, La Viuda de Blanco and recently Rauzán" have been handed in over one hundred countries worldwide. This inexhaustible artist has been invited to countries like Indonesia, the Philippines, Bosnia and Bulgaria as well as Latin America due to the huge rooting his characters have had on the public following their television series. Rauzán, his new novel, has been successful in the presales in Montecarlo for the European market, in fact Eurokom Balkan countries chain has invited him again to promote his new novel.

Presidents of different countries as well as prime ministers and religious have received him in private audience to share and exchange views both artistic and social policies. Led by the writer of the world's most famous soap operas, Delia Fiallo, made several jobs to Mexico's Televisa. His acting in theater has also been favorably reviewed by the critics and the press, winning important awards in works such as La Piaf, La Fortuna y Los Ojos del Hombre, María, and Broadway musicals Guys & Dolls, The King & I and Beauty and the Beast.

In Spain he starred, with singing star Isabel Pantoja, on the series Entre dos Amores for Antena TV. This series, due to its massive impact in Spain as well as that of soap operas Kassandra, Tres Destinos and La Viuda de Blanco, transmitted by TVE 1 and Antena 3, have made Osvaldo the most popular and significant Latin American actor in the land of Cervantes.

As a musician he studied bass and guitar in San Juan, Puerto Rico, being the music his roots in the world of art. His musical interests led him to form groups in his homeland in which he sang, played guitar and bass, and composed most of the songs he played. As a singer has performed on stages in Los Angeles, Miami, New York, Venezuela, Spain, Bulgaria and San Juan, Puerto Rico.

His album En el Alma y en la Piel (Osvaldo is author of 3 songs), reveals an inner universe filled with sensitivity, universal love, passion and capacity for indignation before social injustices that this indefatigable "art worker" has. This complete artist, is responsible for the words and music of his last two television series, La Viuda de Blanco and Santa Esperanza interpreting with the first figures of Latin American music such as Yolandita Monge and Danny Rivera among others. Recently auditioned for the American film market in the movies Beyond Back with Jack Nicholson and Jacqueline Bisset and On Sunset for USA Network.

His last film, under direction of Puerto Rican Vicente Castro, Una Pasión en el Espejo will be released soon in his native Puerto Rico and in several Latin American countries.

In its quest to be a real complete artist, in 1997 he founded his television production company Riverside Entertainment Group and in 1999 his film production company Grupo Gira-Soles Inc., which has made, starred and co-produced three miniseries, two one-episode special TV, a movie and several international projection documentaries. Soon he'll make a film of life's famous Puerto Rican singer Daniel Santos (35mm) and "La Reina del Caserío" (35mm) co-produced with Muvi Films. Also will star the soap opera Ilusiones in Ecuador and Peru, and the plays Tres hombres y un Bebé and El Beso de la Mujer Araña.

Magazines such as Hola, Semana and Lecturas from Spain and more recently Paralelli, from Bulgaria have dedicated unique numbers on their anniversaries. Osvaldo Ríos has kept busy over the past few years, doing work in Colombia (Rauzán), and in Mexico in mega Televisa's projects (Pecado Mortal and Abrázame muy Fuerte), Venezuela (Secuestrado and Protagonistas de Novela), in Ecuador (Mi Conciencia y Yo) and in his native Puerto Rico (Hijos de Nadie II, Plaza Vacante and Más allá del Límite).

2002. He recorded the soap opera Gata Salvaje, recently Ángel Rebelde, both produced by Fonovideo.

2004–2005. He produced and recorded the TV series Miami Special Team.

2006–2007. He recorded a movie in Puerto Rico and starred in several episodes of series Decisiones by Telemundo. As he prepared to play Amador in remake of La Viuda de Blanco, he was asked to play Alejandro de La Vega in Zorro. La Espada y La Rosa, a production that has just recently finished recording. This production has been sold to over 100 countries. Osvaldo recently visited Japan to promote the soap opera and will soon be visiting various countries around the world. He recently received the 2007 FAMA Award for "Best Actor" and, in New York, The Latino Award as Male Figure of year. On May 3, 2008 he received the ACE Award in New York City, as best characteristic actor for his role Alejandro de La Vega in Zorro. La Espada y La Rosa.
He played the role of Santiago in the telenovela El Juramento on Telemundo.

2008. In the leading role he performed El Juramento soap opera, aired on Telemundo in USA and was seen throughout Latin America and Europe with great success. He organized the "Osvaldo Ríos Celebrities Play Game" which brought together celebrities and Miami police in a baseball game to benefit the Foundation "Amigos For Kids" sponsored by Father Alberto and where $15,000 was collected.

2009–2010. He returned, with Televisa, in the new version of Corazón Salvaje in a special performance in which he played Juan de Dios under Salvador Mejía's production.

2010 – 2011. He is working for Televisa, finished recording the soap opera Triunfo del Amor, also with producer Salvador Mejía, a remake of Delia Fiallo's original soap opera Cristal and adapted this time in Liliana Abud's TV version; a beautiful story, he plays for the first time in his career, an actor with the same name. He is Osvaldo Sandoval, a mature actor, well preserved, handsome, manly, who is married to Victoria (Victoria Ruffo) that he loves deeply and with whom he had a daughter named Fernanda. Osvaldo was a widower when he married Victoria. He had a son from his first marriage, Maximiliano (William Levy), whom Victoria has raised as his own and who is determined to become a grown man.

He has been married to three women, actress Sully Diaz, journalist Carmen Dominicci and to actress Geraldine Fernández. 
He has three sons: Giuliano, Osvaldo, and Alessandro.

2012/13 Osvaldo is executive producer and actor in Hollywood film Elsa & Fred and is producing other film projects.

Actor

Filmography

Films

References

External links

Fan Page (Spanish)
Personal Page (Spanish)
Blog(English)
Osvaldo Rios Site(English)
Fan Club

1960 births
Living people
People from Carolina, Puerto Rico
Puerto Rican guitarists
20th-century Puerto Rican male singers
Puerto Rican male telenovela actors
Puerto Rican male television actors
20th-century American guitarists
American male guitarists